The 2007 East Dorset District Council election took place on 3 May 2007 to elect members of East Dorset District Council in Dorset, England. The whole council was up for election and the Conservative Party stayed in overall control of the council.

Election result

Ward results

By-elections between 2007 and 2011

Alderholt

Ferndown Central
A by-election was held in Ferndown Central after the resignation of Conservative councillor Queenie Comfort. The seat was held for the Conservatives by Lesley Dedman with a majority of 33 over independent Jason Lawford.

Corfe Mullen South
A by-election was held in Corfe Mullen South after Liberal Democrat councillor Stewart Hearn resigned from the council. The seat was held for the Liberal Democrats by Philip Harknet with a majority of 128.

References

East Dorset District Council elections
2007 English local elections
2000s in Dorset